Darren Laurie McQueen (born 8 May 1995) is a footballer who plays for Ebbsfleet United He made his professional debut for Ipswich Town on 12 August 2014 in a Football League Cup match against Crawley Town.

Club career
He signed for Maldon & Tiptree of the Isthmian League Division One North on 28 July 2015.
On 26 July 2016, McQueen signed on a season-loan for Ebbsfleet United.

He scored his first goal for Ebbsfleet in a 4–0 win over Margate, coming off the bench to score the fourth goal. He came off the bench again to score in the Fleet's 3–0 win at Bishop Stortford. A few days later, McQueen scored two second half goals in a 5–0 win against Sudbury.

Mcqueen scored a brace of goals on Saturday 17 December as Ebbsfleet breezed past Gosport Borough 2–0

On 1 February 2017, McQueen signed a permanent deal to stay at Ebbsfleet United.

On 21 March 2017 McQueen scored his first ever hat-trick in the Fleet's 8–0 victory over Bishop Stortford.

On 14 June 2019, McQueen joined Dartford.

On 18 August 2020, he joined National League side Dagenham & Redbridge on a free transfer, having previously worked under manager Daryl McMahon at Ebbsfleet.

On 13 August 2021, McQueen joined National League South side Dulwich Hamlet on a season-long loan deal.

On 1 June 2022, Dagenham & Redbridge announced that McQueen would leave the club following the expiration of his contract.

On 27 June 2022, McQueen rejoined Ebbsfleet United.

Career statistics

References

Living people
1995 births
People from Leytonstone
Black British sportspeople
Tottenham Hotspur F.C. players
Ipswich Town F.C. players
Maldon & Tiptree F.C. players
Ebbsfleet United F.C. players
Sutton United F.C. players
Dartford F.C. players
Dagenham & Redbridge F.C. players
Dulwich Hamlet F.C. players
National League (English football) players
Isthmian League players
English footballers
England semi-pro international footballers
Association football forwards